Fabian Forte (born Fabiano Anthony Forte, February 6, 1943), professionally known as Fabian, is an American singer and actor.

Forte rose to national prominence after performing several times on American Bandstand. He became a teen idol of the late 1950s and early 1960s. Eleven of his songs reached the Billboard Hot 100.

Early life
Fabian Forte is the son of Josephine and Dominic Forte; his father was a Philadelphia police officer. He is the eldest of three brothers and grew up in the South Philadelphia's Lower Moyamensing neighborhood.

Discovery
Forte was discovered in 1957 by Bob Marcucci and Peter DeAngelis, owners of Chancellor Records. At the time, record producers were looking to the South Philadelphia neighborhoods in search of teenage talents with good looks.

Marcucci was a friend of Fabian's next-door neighbor. One day, Fabian's father had a heart attack, and, while he was being taken away in an ambulance, Marcucci spotted Fabian. Fabian later recalled, "He kept staring at me and looking at me. I had a crew cut, but this was the day of Rick Nelson and Elvis. He comes up and says to me, 'So if you're ever interested in the rock and roll business...' and hands me his card. I looked at the guy like he was out of his mind. I told him, 'Leave me alone. I'm worried about my dad.'"

When Fabian's father returned from the hospital he was unable to work, so when Marcucci persisted, Fabian and his family were amenable, and he agreed to record a single. Frankie Avalon, also of South Philadelphia, suggested Forte as a possibility. Fabian later said, "They gave me a pompadour and some clothes and those goddamned white bucks and out I went." "He was the right look and right for what we were going for", wrote Marcucci later.

Singing stardom

Early songs
Fabian was given an allowance from the record company of $30 a week. He also kept working part-time at a pharmacy as well as studying at South Philadelphia High School, while practicing his singing. Fabian later said "I didn't know what I was doing, but I knew my goal, to try to make extra money. That meant a lot to our family. I rehearsed and rehearsed, and I really felt like a fish out of water. And we made a record. And it was horrible. Yet it got on Georgie Woods. For some reason, Georgie Woods played it."
 
The song was "Shivers", which was a local hit in Chicago. This helped Fabian meet Dick Clark, who agreed to try Fabian at one of Clark's record hops, where singers would perform to teenage audiences. Fabian lip synched to a song and Clark wrote "the little girls at the hop went wild. They started screaming and yelling for this guy who didn't do a thing but stand there. I've never seen anything like it." Clark told Marcucci "you got a hit, he's a star. Now all you have to do is teach him to sing."

Clark eventually put the young singer on American Bandstand where he sang "I'm in Love". Fabian later admitted this song "was not very good either" but "the response – they told me – was overwhelming. I had no idea. All during that period, I was doing record hops. Not getting paid for it, but for the record company promotions. Just lip synching to my records. The response was really good."

Hit songs
Marcucci gave a song written by Mort Shuman and Doc Pomus to Fabian, "I'm a Man" (not the Bo Diddley hit), which Fabian later said he "liked a lot and was very comfortable with. It was giving me more experience, but I still felt like a fish out of water."

Pomus' biographer later wrote Fabian's "labored reading of a macho lyric lent him a vulnerability that couldn't have been missed by his pubescent fans." The song made the top 40.

Marcucci heavily promoted Fabian's next single, "Turn Me Loose", using a series of advertisements saying "Fabian Is Coming", then "Who is Fabian?" then finally "Fabian is Here". It worked and "Turn Me Loose" went into the Top Ten, peaking at number 9.

This was later followed by "Hound Dog Man", (US #9; UK #46), and his biggest hit, "Tiger", which reached No. 3 on the US charts. It sold over one million copies, and was awarded a gold disc by the RIAA.

Other singles that charted included "String Along", "About This Thing Called Love" and "This Friendly World", which reached No. 12 on the US charts. At age 15, he won the Silver Award as "The Promising Male Vocalist of 1958". His first album, Hold That Tiger reached the top 15 within two weeks.

The song "Think of Me", although it did not chart in US, was a big hit in some Asian countries including Sri Lanka in 1964.

In 1959, Forte told a judge he was earning $250,000 a year. (An earlier report put this at $137,000) He kept up his studies and graduated from high school in June 1960.

During the payola scandal of the 1960s, Forte testified before Congress that his recordings had been doctored electronically to "significantly improve his voice."

His career in music basically ended when he was 18 after he bought out of his contract with Marcucci for $65,000. In 1974, he said, "I felt controlled. I felt like a puppet. It was frightening, like a three-year nightmare."

Marcucci later admitted to punching Fabian on one occasion when the singer sat in the aisle of a movie theatre, not in the middle of the row like Marcucci had asked; Fabian was spotted by a teenage fan who screamed. Marcucci was angry that he did not see the film and hit the singer. In 1963, he signed a contract with Dot Records. He spent the next thirteen years concentrating on acting.

Fabian later said in 1971 that "I must say I never knew [Marcucci] to cheat me out of any money due me and he never promised me anything he didn't deliver." He stated he left his manager because "all the songs were sounding the same. So I bought myself out of the contract. It cost me plenty – a lot more than I thought it would."

Acting

20th Century Fox
20th Century-Fox had enjoyed success casting teen idol pop stars in movies, such as Elvis Presley and Pat Boone. They decided to do the same thing with Fabian and signed him to a long-term contract. His first leading role was Hound-Dog Man (1959), based on the novel by Fred Gipson (who had written Old Yeller) and directed by Don Siegel. He co-starred with the more experienced Stuart Whitman and sang several songs, including the title track. The Psychotronic Encyclopedia of Film featured a photo of Forte's screen test where he appeared in the same outfit that Elvis Presley wore in Fox's Love Me Tender. "Acting came natural to me. I don't know why", Fabian later said.

Fabian's recording of the Hound Dog Man title song was a top ten hit but the film was not a financial success – in contrast to Presley and Boone's first films. The studio, however, tried again in two smaller roles, supporting a bigger star – High Time, with Bing Crosby, and North to Alaska, with John Wayne. Both films were popular especially the latter and in November 1960 his contract with the studio was amended with an increase in salary – it was now a seven-year deal with an option for two films a year. He later said that "acting wasn't like the singing, because it was very private – quiet on the set. No screaming [teenage fans]. It was a wonderful experience. I got to meet and work with John Wayne, Jimmy Stewart, and Peter Lorre. Elvis came over to meet me when I was on the lot. Marilyn Monroe, Natalie Wood and Gary Cooper were also on the lot. I was on the plane with Marlon Brando for eight hours coming back from Tahiti."

The Fox contract included television series as well as films. Fabian was cast by director Robert Altman as a psychotic killer in "A Lion Walks Among Us", an episode of the television series Bus Stop. This episode was highly controversial due to its violent content, with many affiliates refusing to run the program, so much so, that it was even mentioned in the US Senate. However, the series was good for Fabian's acting career, and saw him regarded with more respect. He later said he regarded this as his best performance.

Paramount borrowed him from Fox to co-star with teen idol Tommy Sands in Love in a Goldfish Bowl (1961). In 1961, Bob Marcucci announced that Fabian and Avalon would star in Virginia Ridge by Clarence Fillmore about the Battle of New Market, where Virginia Military cadets took on union soldiers. The movie was never made.

Instead Fabian co-starred opposite Tuesday Weld in an episode of The Dick Powell Show, titled "Run Till It's Dark". In Mr. Hobbs Takes a Vacation (1962), he romanced (and sang with) the daughter of a family man played by James Stewart; this was a big hit. So too was The Longest Day (1962), Fox's all-star epic about the D-Day landings; Fabian appeared among a number of other teen idols as US Rangers. Less popular, though still widely seen, was Five Weeks in a Balloon (1962), Irwin Allen's take on Jules Verne; Fabian sang one song but again it was a supporting role.

When Fox temporarily shut down following cost overruns on Cleopatra, Fabian was one of the first actors whose options were exercised after the studio re-opened. He was to have supported Stewart again in Take Her, She's Mine (1963) but did not appear in the final film. Samuel Z. Arkoff of American International Pictures said he wanted Fabian to play the lead in Beach Party (1963) but was unable to do it because of his Fox contract.

Fabian had not become a film star but was in demand as an actor, appearing in episodes of series like The Virginian, Wagon Train, The Greatest Show on Earth and The Eleventh Hour.

He had a good role in a surf movie made for Columbia, Ride the Wild Surf (1964) (with Tab Hunter), and was reunited with James Stewart for Fox's Dear Brigitte (1965) – the film failed to repeat the success of Hobbs. Harry Alan Towers cast him as one of the victims in Ten Little Indians (1965).

In October 1965, Fox announced it had picked up Fabian's option to make three more films for the studio, starting with Custer's Last Stand. However, that film was not made and Fabian made no further films for Fox.

AIP
In November 1965, he signed a seven-picture deal with American International Pictures (AIP). His first film for the company was alongside Beach Party stars Frankie Avalon and Annette Funicello in the 1966 stock car racing film Fireball 500. AIP then sent him to Italy to play a role originally intended for Avalon in Dr. Goldfoot and the Girl Bombs (1966), supporting Vincent Price and directed by Mario Bava. Back in the United States, he made another stock car racing film for AIP, Thunder Alley (1967), opposite Funicello and directed by Richard Rush. His fourth movie for AIP was Maryjane (1968), where Fabian played a school teacher fighting the evils of the marijuana trade.

He returned to racing car dramas with The Wild Racers (1968), partly financed by Roger Corman and shot in Europe. This was not a big hit on release but has developed a cult following; Quentin Tarantino described it as his favorite racing car movie.

The Devil's 8 (1968) was an AIP rip-off of The Dirty Dozen (with a script co-written by John Milius). His seventh and final film for the studio was A Bullet for Pretty Boy (1970).

Fabian also played Josh Ashley in Little Laura and Big John (1973) for Crown International Pictures.

He performed in John Loves Mary in summer stock in 1962.

Later years
Forte later admitted the pressures of his career and home life caused him to start drinking in the 1960s. From June 1969 onwards he was billed as "Fabian Forte".

Return to singing
In 1973, he began singing again. To raise his profile, he posed nude for Playgirl magazine. "I knew it was a mistake the minute I saw the thing sold in a paper bag. I could barely live with myself."

In January 1974 he started an act at the MGM-Grand in Las Vegas. He was managed at this stage by Allan Carr. In March 1974 he performed at the Blue Max of the Hyatt Regency O'Hara in Chicago. A review said "he seems rather lost in the act he was putting on... he's giving it the old beach party try. But all that, unfortunately, can't distract for long from the basic lack of talent." In October 1974 Carr – by then no longer his manager – said that Fabian was "a sensational lounge act in Nevada and shouldn't play anywhere else except on prom nights. He's not a middle of the road act in a middle of the road room. At the 12.30 am show at the Blue Max, when the conventioneers had had a few drinks it was terrific... This boy probably made $18,000 last year; this year he'll make about $270,000."

He often performed in Las Vegas in the mid 1970s until he fell into difficulties with the authorities after attacking a Las Vegas district attorney, and resultant bankruptcy.

He retired once more in 1977, then resumed performing in 1981. He never regained his teenage popularity, but has continued performing.

The Idolmaker
The film The Idolmaker (1980), written by Edward Di Lorenzo and the first feature film directed by Taylor Hackford, was a thinly disguised biography of Fabian (called Caesare in the film), as well as songwriter/producer Marcucci (called Vinnie Vacarri) and Frankie Avalon (called Tommy Dee). In the movie version, singer Caesare—a pretty boy with little singing talent—goes through a whirlwind of success in a short time, and in a fit of pique, he abruptly fires his songwriters and quits his record label. The real-life Fabian launched a $64 million lawsuit at the time of the picture's release, claiming the film made him look like "a totally manufactured singer, a mere pretty face without any singing ability or acting talent." The filmmakers insisted that the movie presented only fictional characters (although Marcucci was a paid consultant on the film). Forte claimed they settled out of court, where he and his wife received apologies and Marcucci's 7.5% ownership of the film passed to Forte.

He appeared in a 1982 television commercial for The Idols of Rock n' Roll and in the documentary film The Bituminous Coal Queens of Pennsylvania (2005). In the 1980s, he developed some sitcoms for television. Forte hosted and headlined in the hit show The Original Stars of Bandstand at The Dick Clark Theater in Branson, Missouri. The show starred Forte and Bobby Vee and featured The Chiffons, Brian Hyland, Chris Montez and rare footage of the performers and Dick Clark. As part of a long-running concert tour, Fabian has toured with fellow Philadelphian 1950s teen idols Bobby Rydell and Frankie Avalon as Dick Fox's Golden Boys.

Personal life
He was drafted, but rejected, for military service during the Vietnam War. According to USMC Lt. Col. Arthur Eppley, Forte was declared 4F (unfit for service).

In 1982, he was arrested for reportedly sticking his cigarette into a passenger  who asked him to put out the cigarette in a non-smoking section of an aircraft. The passenger turned out to be a district attorney, but ultimately no charges were brought.

Race car accident
In 1978, Fabian was participating in a charity racing event in Watkins Glen, New York. He was practicing at Willow Springs International Motorsports Park under the instruction of professional driver Bill Simpson when he rolled his car and suffered minor cuts and bruises.

In 1982, a jury found him 40% liable for the accident (Fabian testified that Simpson repeatedly urged him to drive faster while Simpson testified that Fabian suddenly accelerated wildly in spite of his orders to slow down). He received $32,000 in an out-of-court settlement.

Marriages
Forte has been married three times. His first marriage was to model Kathleen Regan in September 1966. They had two children together, Christian and Julie, before separating in June 1975. In October 1975, Forte was arrested after an argument with Regan in which he was accused of hitting her. He was put on probation for two years. The couple divorced in 1979. "My fault", said Fabian.

He married Kate Netter in 1980; they divorced in 1990.

In 1998, he married Andrea Patrick, a former Bituminous Coal Queen and Miss Pennsylvania USA. He and Andrea were later sued by the resort where they were married for unpaid bills.

Fabian relocated from Los Angeles to Fayette County, Pennsylvania, to be closer to his wife's family; he and his wife were sued by the builder of their house, also for unpaid bills. In 2013, he said he played "25 shows a year. It gets me out of the house ... I've never been happier. [At home] I ride my ATV and tractor and cut the grass. Where I grew up, there wasn't any grass."

He and Patrick also work for Gladys Magazine.

Philanthropy
Fabian and Andrea Forte are actively involved in the American Diabetes Association, the American Heart Association and Forte has helped raise money for veterans with his Celebrity Golf Tournament in North Carolina.

Discography
All albums use Forte's mononymous name Fabian. Before going to Chancellor records, Forte cut two albums on his own, one of which contained the original version of the song "Old Time Rock and Roll", but both albums were a commercial failure.

Singles

Albums
Hold That Tiger (1959)
The Fabulous Fabian (1959)
The Fabian Facade: Young and Wonderful (1959)
The Good Old Summertime (1960)
Rockin' Hot (1961)
Fabian's 16 Fabulous Hits (1962)
Fabulously Grateful (1963)

Filmography

Hound-Dog Man (1959) – Clint McKinney
High Time (1960) – Gil Sparrow
North to Alaska (1960) – Billy Pratt
Love in a Goldfish Bowl (1961) – Giuseppe La Barba
Mr. Hobbs Takes a Vacation (1962) – Joe Carmody
Five Weeks in a Balloon (1962) – Jacques
The Longest Day (1962) – U.S. Army Ranger
Ride the Wild Surf (1964) – Jody Wallis
Dear Brigitte (1965) – Kenneth 'Kenny' Taylor
Ten Little Indians (1965) – Mike Raven
Fireball 500 (1966) – Sonny Leander
Dr. Goldfoot and the Girl Bombs (1966) – Bill Dexter
Thunder Alley (1967) – Tommy Callahan
Maryjane (1968) – Phil Blake
The Wild Racers (1968) – Joe Joe Quillico
The Devil's 8 (1969) – Sonny
A Bullet for Pretty Boy (1970) – Charles Arthur 'Pretty Boy' Floyd
The Hard Ride (1971) – Police officer (uncredited)
Soul Hustler (1976) – Matthew Crowe 
Little Laura and Big John (1973) – John
Getting Married (aired 17 May 1978 TV movie) – Wayne Spanka
Katie: Portrait of a Centrefold (aired 23 October 1978 TV movie) – Emcee
Disco Fever (1978) – Richie Desmond
Crisis in Mid-Air (aired 13 February 1979 TV movie) – Billy Coleman
Kiss Daddy Goodbye (1981) – Deputy Blanchard
American Pop (1981) 
Get Crazy (1983) – Marv 
Runaway Daughters (aired 12 August 1994 TV movie) – Mr. Rusoff
Up Close & Personal (1996) – Himself
Mr. Rock 'n' Roll: The Alan Freed Story (aired 31 October 1999)

Television
Bus Stop – 2 December 1961 – episode "A Lion Walks Among Us"
The Gertrude Berg Show – 8 February 1962 – episode "Peace Corps"
The Dick Powell Show – 9 October 1962 – episode "Run Till It's Dark" with Tuesday Weld 
The Virginian – 23 January 1963 – episode "Say Goodbye to All That" – with Lee J. Cobb
Wagon Train – 16 September 1963 – episode "Molly Kincaid Story" w/Barbara Stanwyck, Carolyn Jones
The Greatest Show on Earth – 29 October 1963 – "Uncaged"
The Eleventh Hour – 22 January 1964 – episode "You're So Smart, Why Can't You Be Good?" – with Fay Wray
The Virginian – 6 January 1965 – episode "Two Men Named Laredo"
Daniel Boone (1964 TV series) – 9 December 1965 – Season 2 Episode 12 "The First Beau" – David Ellis with Veronica Cartwright
The Virginian – 2 October 1966 – "The Outcast" 
The Rat Patrol – 30 January 1967 – "The B Negative Raid"
Bob Hope Presents the Chrysler Theatre (1967) – episode "Wipeout"
The F.B.I. – 3 January 1971 – episode "Unknown Victim" – with Tom Skerritt
Love, American Style – 23 February 1973 – episode "Love and the Crisis Line/Love and the Happy Family/Love and the Vertical Romance" – with Ed Begley Jr.
Laverne & Shirley – 22 November 1977 – episode "Laverne and Shirley Meet Fabian"
The Hardy Boys/Nancy Drew Mysteries – 26 February 1978 – episode "Mystery on the Avalanche Express" – with Deborah Walley
Fantasy Island (1980) – episode "PlayGirl/Smith's Valhalla" – with Leslie Nielsen
The Love Boat – 20 February 1982 – episode "New York, A.C./Live It Up/All's Fair in Love and War" – with Edd Byrnes, Jill St. John, Bobby Sherman and Annette Funicello
New Love, American Style – 3 January 1986 – "Love and the Girl of My Dreams"
The Facts of Life – 21 February 1987 – "62 Pick Up"
Rags to Riches – 5 April 1987 – episode "Business is Business"
Amen – 30 March 1991 – episode "Deak Scam"
The Wild West – 22 March 1993 – documentary (Fabian co-executive produced)
Blossom – 14 & 21 February 1994 "Beach Blanket Blossom"
Murphy Brown – 6 April 1998 – episode "Opus One" with Chubby Checker and Lesley Gore

Television variety
American Bandstand – 19 June 1958 – sang "I'm in Love"
American Bandstand – 20 June 1958 – sang "I'm in Love" again
The Dick Clark Saturday Night Beechnut Show – 28 June 1958 – sang "I'm in Love" – with Paul Anka
American Bandstand – 30 June 1958 – did not sing
The Dick Clark Saturday Night Beechnut Show – 13 September 1958 – sang "Lilly Lou"
The Dick Clark Saturday Night Beechnut Show – 6 December 1958 – sang "I'm a Man"
American Bandstand – 12 December 1958 – sang "I'm a Man"
The Dick Clark Saturday Night Beechnut Show – 17 January 1959 – sang "I'm a Man" and "Hypnotised"
The Dick Clark Saturday Night Beechnut Show – 7 March 1959 – sang "Turn Me Loose" and "Stop Thief!"
American Bandstand – 12 March 1959 – sang "Turn Me Loose"
The Perry Como Show – 4 April 1959 – sang "Turn Me Loose"
The Dick Clark Saturday Night Beechnut Show – 18 April 1959 – sang "Turn Me Loose" and "Hold Me in Your Arms"
The Ed Sullivan Show – 24 May 1959
The Ed Sullivan Show – 21 June 1959
This Is Your Life – Dick Clark – 24 June 1959
American Bandstand 2nd Anniversary Show – 5 August 1959 – makes congratulatory phone call
The Dick Clark Saturday Night Beechnut Show – 22 August 1959 – sang "Got the Feeling" and "Come On and Get Me"
The Red Skelton Show – "Freddie and Fabian" – 11 November 1959 – sang "This Friendly World"
The Dick Clark Saturday Night Beechnut Show – 14 November 1959 – sang "Hound Dog Man"
What's My Line? – 15 November 1959 – as the mystery guest
"Startime" The Dean Martin Variety House – 12 January 1960 – sings "I Love the Love" (with Martin) and "All of Me"
The Red Skelton Show – 2 February 1960 – appears in a sketch and sings "About This Thing Called Love"
The Dick Clark Saturday Night Beechnut Show – 12 March 1960 – sings "String Along" and "About This Thing Called Love"
The Dick Clark Saturday Night Beechnut Show – 27 August 1960 – sings "King of Love" and "Tomorrow"
The Perry Como Show – 5 October 1960 – sings "Rambling Wreck from Georgia Tech", "Buckle Down Winsocki Buckle Down", "Saturday Afternoon Before The Game" (with Frankie Avalon and Como), "Long Before"
American Bandstand – 16 December 1960 – sang "Kissin' and Twistin'" and "Long Before"
Candid Camera – 1961 – goes to Hackensack High School in Hackensack, New Jersey where he is introduced to a female student to see their reaction
Here's Hollywood – 3 August 1961 – guest on talk show
The New March of Dimes: The Scene Stealers – 2 January 1962 – guest star on charity revue
American Bandstand – 30 November 1962
Pantomime Quiz – 26 August 1963 – Julie London v Fabian
Fractured Flickers – 1963 – special guest
American Bandstand – 8 August 1964 – sang "Cream Puff"
American Bandstand – 22 August 1964
Hollywood Squares – 1–5 May 1967
Hollywood Squares – 25–29 September 1967
Tattletales – 1974: one week/5 episodes with first wife Katie
Good Old Days – 11 October 1977 – with Dick Clark and Frankie Avalon
Rock and Rollers – 1978
Sorority '62 – 1978
Hollywood Squares – 1979
Rock and Roll: The Early Days – 1984
Good Time Rock 'n' Roll – 1985
Hollywood Squares – 6–10 April 1987
Hollywood Squares – 14–18 March 1989
Let's Rock Tonight – 1989
Lost in the '50s – 6 October 1989
Remember – 29 June 1991 – PBS
Hollywood Rocks the Movies: The Early Years (1955–70) – 2 July 2000 (documentary)
At the Drive In – 28 November 2003 (host)

Theatre
John Loves Mary (1962)
Love is a Time of Day (1971) – Windmill Dinner Theatre
Grease (1998) – touring theatre productions

Unmade projects
The Beardless Warriors (1960) – for 20th Century Fox based on the novel by Richard Matheson
A Summer World (1961) – for 20th Century Fox with Dolores Hart and Bradford Dillman about a high school student who falls for an older woman (Suzy Parker), based on a script by Howard Koch from the novel by Richard Dougherty – directed by Franklin J. Shaeffner – allegedly postponed when Dillman refused to appear next to Fabian
Take Her, She's Mine (1963) – Fabian was originally announced for the male lead
Robin Hood Jones (1965) – for AIP
Custer's Last Stand (1965) – an often-postponed film for Fox where Fabian was to play an Indian scout
a migrant farm labourer in a biopic written by Alex Grasshoff, who had previously made a documentary about him for David L. Wolper – this was a passion project for Fabian who spent weeks researching the film (circa 1967)
The Oblong Box (1969) – Fabian originally was announced as Vincent Price's co star
Bury an Angel (1970), film made by Burwalt Productions starring Robert Fuller and Sherry Bain
Golden Boy (1972) – produced by David Roseman and William Lieberman under the direction of Herbert Hantman from a screenplay by Lory Patrick – also starring Paul Micale and Jacqueline Bosordi – also known as Murder Can Be Fatal
Fabian was also reportedly considered for roles in West Side Story (1961) and The Roman Spring of Mrs Stone.

See also

 Mononymous persons
 History of the Italian Americans in Philadelphia

References

Additional sources

External links
 
 
 
 
 Fabian at Brian's Drive In Theater
 Biography at Universal Attractions

1943 births
Living people
20th-century American male actors
20th Century Studios contract players
Male actors from Philadelphia
American male film actors
American male singers
American male television actors
American male pop singers
American people of Italian descent
American rock singers
Playgirl Men of the Month
Rock and roll musicians
Television producers from Pennsylvania
Musicians from Philadelphia
Singers from Pennsylvania
Chancellor Records artists